The Oberheim OB-X was the first of Oberheim's OB-series polyphonic analog subtractive synthesizers.

First commercially available in  June 1979, the OB-X was introduced to compete with the Sequential Circuits Prophet-5, which had been successfully introduced the year before. About 800 units were produced  before the OB-X was discontinued and replaced by the updated and streamlined OB-Xa in 1981. The OB line developed and evolved after that with the OB-8 before being replaced by the Matrix series.

The OB-X was used in popular music by Rush (on Moving Pictures and Signals), Nena, Styx member Dennis DeYoung (used frequently from late 1979 to 1984), Queen (their first synthesizer on an album), Madonna for her debut album, Prince, and Jean-Michel Jarre who used it for its "brass" sounds.

Specification

The OB-X was the first Oberheim synthesizer based on a single printed circuit board called a "voice card" (still using mostly discrete components) rather than the earlier SEM (Synthesizer Expander Module) used in Oberheim semi-modular systems, which had required multiple modules to achieve polyphony. The OB-X's memory held 32 user-programmable presets. The synthesizer's built-in Z-80 microprocessor also automated the tuning process. This made the OB-X less laborious to program, more functional for live performance, and more portable than its ancestors.

The "X" in OB-X originally stood for the number of voice-cards (notes of polyphony) installed. It came in four, six, and eight-voice models with polyphonic portamento, and sample and hold. Even the 4-voice model was expensive at US$4,595. The entire range used "paddle" levers for pitch and modulation, Oberheim's answer to the "wheel" controls of the Prophet-5. Though these controls were never as popular as the standard pitch and modulation wheels, the philosophy was to mimic the motion of a guitar player bending the strings on their guitar. On most other synthesizers the pitch bend wheel was on the left, and the modulation wheel to the right of it; on the OB-X Oberheim placed them in the opposite relative positions. In addition to this unique configuration the polarity of the paddles was distinctive; the player would pull back on the pitch lever to bend the pitch sharp, and push forward to bend flat.

Albums and songs featuring OB-X

 Ambrosia – Road Island (1982)
 Laurie Anderson – United States Live (1984)
 The Beatles - Free as a Bird (1995)
 Kim Carnes – Voyeur (1982)
 Christopher Cross – Christopher Cross  (1979)
 Chromeo – Business Casual (2010) (Most notably as the intro of You Make It Rough).
 Paul Davis – 1980 self-titled LP on the song "All The Way" (1979)
 Earth, Wind & Fire – Faces (1980)
 Earth, Wind & Fire – Raise! (1981)
 Electric Light Orchestra – Time (1981)
 Eurythmics – "Sweet Dreams (Are Made of This)" (1983)
 John Foxx – The Garden (1981)
 Jerry Goldsmith – Star Trek: The Motion Picture (1979)
 Amy Grant – A Christmas Album (1983)
 Dave Grusin – Out of the Shadows (1982)
 Bruce Hornsby & The Range – The Way It Is (1986)
 Bruce Hornsby & The Range – Scenes from the Southside (1988)
 Rick James – Garden of Love (1980)
 Rick James – Street Songs (1981)
 Rick James – Throwin' Down (1982)
 Chaz Jankel – Chasanova (1981)
 Japan – Gentlemen Take Polaroids (1980)
 Japan – Tin Drum (1981)
 Jean-Michel Jarre – Rendez-Vous (1986)
 Billy Joel – Glass Houses (1980)
 Chaka Khan – Chaka Khan (1982)
 Killing Joke – Killing Joke (1980)
 Killing Joke – Night Time (1985)
 Killing Joke – Brighter than a Thousand Suns (1986)
 Kool and the Gang – Something Special (1981)
 Kool and the Gang – As One (1982)
 Kool and the Gang – In the Heart (1983)
 Ronnie Laws – Solid Ground (1981)
 Ronnie Laws – Mr. Nice Guy (1983)
 John Lennon and Yoko Ono - Double Fantasy (1980)
 Liaisons Dangereuses – Live in Hacienda (1982)
 Jeff Lorber – Wizard Island (1980)
 Jeff Lorber – Galaxian (1981)
 Madonna – Madonna (1983)
 Missing Persons – Spring Session M (1982)
 Joni Mitchell – Wild Things Run Fast (1982)
 Nena – Nena (1983)
 Nena – 99 Luftballons (1984)
 Olivia Newton-John – Physical (1981)
 Mike Oldfield - Crises (1982)
 Orchestral Manoeuvres in the Dark – Dazzle Ships (1983)
 Robert Palmer – Clues (1980)
 Prince – Dirty Mind (1980)
 Prince – Controversy (1981)
 Queen – The Game (1980)
 Queen – Flash Gordon (1980)
 Queen – Hot Space (1982)
 Roxy Music – Avalon (1982)
 Rush – Moving Pictures (1981)
 Rush – Signals (1982)
 David Sanborn – "The Seduction" on Hideaway (1980)
 David Sanborn – Voyeur (1981)
 Serú Girán – Bicicleta (1980)
 Serú Girán – Peperina (1981)
 Serú Girán – Yo no quiero volverme tan loco (1981) 
 Shakatak – Drivin' Hard (1981)
 Shakatak – Night Birds (1982)
 Carly Simon – Come Upstairs (1980)
 Simple Minds – Sons and Fascination/Sister Feelings Call (1981)
 Michael W. Smith – Michael W. Smith Project (1983)
 Spinetta Jade – Alma de Diamante (1980)
 Spinetta Jade – Los niños que escriben en el cielo (1981)
 Spinetta Jade – Madre en años luz (1984)
 Styx – Paradise Theatre (1981)
 Styx – Kilroy Was Here (1983)
 Styx – Caught In The Act Live! (1984)
 Supertramp – ...Famous Last Words... (1982)
 Talk Talk – The Party's Over (1982)
 The System – Sweat (1983)
 The Time – The Time (1981)
 Tangerine Dream – Tangram (1980)
 Tangerine Dream – Thief (1981)
 Tangerine Dream – Exit (1981)
 Ultravox – Rage in Eden (1981)
 Ultravox – Quartet (1982)
 Van Halen – 1984 (1984)
 Yellowjackets – Yellowjackets (1981)
 Yellowjackets – Mirage a Trois'' (1983)

Hardware re-issues and recreations 
In May 2022, the Oberheim OB-X8, a new 8-voice analog synthesizer with the voice architecture and filters of three classic Oberheim models: the OB-X, OB-Xa, and OB-8, along with functionality and features not included on the original models, was announced. The new synthesizer is manufactured by Sequential in partnership with Tom Oberheim.

References

External links
 OB-X profile on Vintage Synth Explorer
 
 

OB-X
Analog synthesizers
Polyphonic synthesizers